Machaerirhynchus is a genus of passerine birds with affinities to woodswallows and butcherbirds. The two species are known as boatbills. The genus is distributed across New Guinea and northern Queensland.

The species are:
 Black-breasted boatbill, M. nigripectus, found in New Guinea
 Yellow-breasted boatbill, M. flaviventer, found in northeast Australia

External links
 A page on boatbills at Don Roberson's world birding website

 
Bird genera